Angela Gwen Stanford (born November 28, 1977) is an American professional golfer who currently competes on the LPGA Tour.

Amateur career
Born and raised in Saginaw, Texas, Stanford won the Fort Worth Girls Championship four times (1993–1996), the 1996 Texas State 4A High School Championship and the 1996 PING Texas State Junior Championship. Following graduation from Boswell High School in 1996, she enrolled at Texas Christian University (TCU) in Fort Worth. Stanford won nine collegiate tournaments for the Horned Frogs, was a four-time All-American and a four-time All-Western Athletic Conference (WAC) selection. She was named WAC Freshman of the Year in 1997 and WAC Player of the Year in 1999 and won the 2000 WAC Championship. She earned a bachelor's degree in speech communication from TCU in 2000. Stanford was a member of the 2000 U.S. Curtis Cup team and a semifinalist at the 2000 British Ladies Amateur.

Professional career
Stanford turned professional following the 2000 U.S. Women's Amateur in August and played on the Futures Tour, where she earned a victory at the season-ending event in early October. She finished fourth in the LPGA Final Qualifying Tournament that year to earn exempt status on the LPGA Tour for 2001.

Her first victory on the LPGA Tour came in her third season, at the 2003 ShopRite LPGA Classic. A week later Stanford was in a three player 18-hole playoff for the U.S. Women's Open; she lost to Hilary Lunke by one stroke. Her best finish on the LPGA money was in 2008, at ninth place with over $1.1 million.

Stanford has been a member of six U.S. Solheim Cup teams: in 2003, 2007, 2009, 2011, 2013, and 2015, where in the penultimate match, she defeated Suzann Pettersen which cleared the way for Paula Creamer to score the winning point, and gave the U.S. Its first Solheim Cup win since 2009.

On September 16, 2018, Stanford won her first major title at the Evian Championship.

Professional wins (8)

LPGA Tour wins (7)

LPGA Tour playoff record (1–4)

Futures Tour wins (1)
2000 (1) Summit Consulting SBC Futures Tour Championship

Major championships

Wins (1)

Results timeline
Results not in chronological order before 2019 or in 2020.

^ The Women's British Open replaced the du Maurier Classic as an LPGA major in 2001
^^ The Evian Championship was added as a major in 2013

CUT = missed the half-way cut
NT = no tournament
T = tied

Summary

Most consecutive cuts made – 12 (2009 British Open – 2012 British Open)
Longest streak of top-10s – 2 (2013 Evian – 2014 Kraft Nabisco)

LPGA Tour career summary

 official through 2022 season
* Includes matchplay and other tournaments with no cut

World ranking
Position in Women's World Golf Rankings at the end of each calendar year.

Team appearances
Amateur
Curtis Cup (representing the United States): 2000 (winners)

Professional
Solheim Cup (representing the United States): 2003, 2007 (winners), 2009 (winners), 2011, 2013,  2015 (winners)
Lexus Cup (representing International team): 2006, 2008 (winners)

Solheim Cup record

References

External links 

American female golfers
TCU Horned Frogs women's golfers
LPGA Tour golfers
Winners of LPGA major golf championships
Solheim Cup competitors for the United States
Golfers from Texas
Sportspeople from Fort Worth, Texas
1977 births
Living people